Funkstep (also known as dubbage) is a style of UK funky, incorporating elements of dubstep and sometimes drum and bass.

History 
Since the dubstep movement in 2001, funkstep has gained more listeners and therefore more record producers to produce this music style. Funkstep took shape since 2012 by blending the genres of dubstep, drumstep, drum and bass, UK funky and electro house.

Characteristics 
The changes of speed in funkstep are evident, since drumstep will register at anywhere from 150 to 170 BPM as a result of its 2-step beat and French and electro house by contrast between 120 and 130 BPM. This problem is usually solved by playing the song during its drumstep or even dubstep parts in half speed, as compared to the occurring house in similar parts.

Most funkstep songs start with calm intros, which can sometimes be mixed up with drumstep because of its dubstep and drum and bass-like drums. But after starting with a typical funkstep riff and changing the bassdrum to a consistent 4x4-cadence, it is easy to recognize the bridge to more complex house music, which is typical for a funkstep song. A song can contain these bridges and changes repeatedly, which mostly indicate the drops and highlights.
Funkstep is also often in conjunction with glitch because of their similar BPM and arsenal of distorted sounds.

Since funkstep contains parts sounding similar to different variations of house, drum and bass and drumstep, it is attractive for listeners of several styles of music and pretty diverse.

Since 2009, notable scene reports were trying to simply explain the idea of funkstep to the audience, posting headlines like "Dubstep + Funky House = Funkstep".

References

External links 
Discussion about Funkstep and sibling genres
Factmag reporting about Funkstep
XLR8R Magazine about variations of Funkstep
Feral One Records

Electronic dance music genres
UK funky
Dubstep
English styles of music